Groß Kreutz is a municipality in the Potsdam-Mittelmark district, in Brandenburg, Germany.

Demography

The "Groß Kreutz" Group 
The settlement gave its name to the Groß Kreutz Group of exiled Norwegians who were active in humanitarian work in the later stages of WWII, and were based at an estate in the area.  Group initiatives included the White Buses Operation in the spring of 1945. Members of the group included Johan Bernhard Hjort, Didrik Arup Seip and Wanda Hjort Heger.

References

Localities in Potsdam-Mittelmark